Rafael Martiniano de Miranda Moura (born 23 May 1983), or simply Rafael Moura, is a Brazilian footballer who plays as a striker.

Career
Rafael Moura started his career with Atlético Mineiro, he then left for Vitória.

In July 2005, he left for Paysandu, signed a contract until the end of season.

Rafael Moura signed a contract with MSI in 2006 which lasted until 2012, he then left for MSI affiliated club Corinthians. In January 2007 he left for Swiss lower division club Locarno along with Jhonny Herrera but still under MSI control. He signed an 8-month contract with Fluminense in January 2007.

Moura left for French Ligue 1 side FC Lorient on a 1-year loan from Fluminense (actually MSI) in August 2007. Lorient had a first option to sign him outright in June 2008.

On 1 July 2008, Moura returned to Brazil for Atlético Paranaense, signed a 2-year loan contract.

The loan terminated in January 2010, and Moura signed a 1-year loan deal with Goiás on 22 January.

After an on-pitch brawl on 21 July 2010, the match that Goiás 2–2 draw with his former club Vitória, Moura was provisionally banned from football for a month. He finished as the runner-up with team at 2010 Copa Sudamericana.

In January 2011, he rejoined Fluminense and signed a 3-year deal. Moves to Internacional and Atlético Mineiro followed. In 2016, not long after joining Atlético Mineiro, Moura completed a loan move to Figueirense.

In December 2017, after terminating his contract with Atlético, Moura joined América Mineiro.

Honours
Vitória
Campeonato Baiano: 2005

Fluminense
Copa do Brasil: 2007
Campeonato Carioca: 2012

Atlético Paranaense
Campeonato Paranaense: 2009

Internacional
Campeonato Gaúcho: 2013, 2014, 2015

Atlético Mineiro
Campeonato Mineiro: 2017

Botafogo
Campeonato Brasileiro Série B: 2021

References

External links
 
 

 

Brazilian footballers
Brazilian expatriate footballers
Clube Atlético Mineiro players
Esporte Clube Vitória players
Paysandu Sport Club players
Sport Club Corinthians Paulista players
Fluminense FC players
FC Lorient players
Club Athletico Paranaense players
Goiás Esporte Clube players
Sport Club Internacional players
Figueirense FC players
América Futebol Clube (MG) players
Botafogo de Futebol e Regatas players
Campeonato Brasileiro Série A players
Campeonato Brasileiro Série B players
Ligue 1 players
Expatriate footballers in France
Brazilian expatriate sportspeople in France
Association football forwards
Footballers from Belo Horizonte
1983 births
Living people